Lysiosepalum is a genus of plants in the family Malvaceae, endemic to the south-west of Western Australia.

Species
The following is a list of names of Lysiosepalum species accepted by the Australian Plant Census as at April 2022:
Lysiosepalum abollatum C.F.Wilkins - woolly lysiosepalum
Lysiosepalum aromaticum C.F.Wilkins
Lysiosepalum hexandrum (S.Moore) S.Moore 
Lysiosepalum involucratum (Turcz.) Druce  
Lysiosepalum rugosum Benth. - wrinkled-leaf lysiosepalum

References

 
Malvales of Australia
Rosids of Western Australia
Malvaceae genera